Kienle Nunataks are three aligned nunataks to the north of Mount Terror in northeastern Ross Island, Antarctica. At the suggestion of P.R. Kyle, they were named by the Advisory Committee on Antarctic Names after Juergen Kienle of the Geophysical Institute, University of Alaska Fairbanks, a United States Antarctic Program team leader for the investigation of volcanic activity and seismicity on Mount Erebus in six field seasons, 1980–81 through 1985–86.

References

Nunataks of Ross Island